Bar'am (lit. Son of the People), sometimes spelled as Baram, is a kibbutz in northern Israel. Located approximately 300 meters from Israel's border with Lebanon near the ruins of the ancient Jewish village of  Kfar Bar'am. Bar'am National Park is known for the remains of one of Israel's oldest synagogues.

History
The site of Bar'am has been inhabited by the Jews and their ancient ancestors the Israelites, since ancient times. The ancient Jewish village of Bar'am existed from the 3rd century BCE at its earliest with Jews maintaining a continuous presence in the village until sometime after the 13th century CE. The village and its Jewish population is referenced in several historic accounts, In 1210 CE, Rabbi Shmuel bar Shimshon wrote of two beautiful synagogues that were in use in the Village of Baram in Galilee. These synagogues still stand today, and on the window over the right hand entrance of the larger synagogue, there is an engraving in Aramaic which reads "Built by Elazar son of Yuden (or Yudan)". Later in 1210, Rabbi Yehiel of Paris recorded his visit to the village in his writings. However by 1522, the Italian Rabbi Moshe Basula writes of the Bar'am's apparent abandonment, as did Rabbi Moshe of Jerusalem in 1769. The Maronite Christians from Lebanon built their village atop the Jewish ruins on the site sometime in the 19th century. Their church stands on top of the hill opposite the large synagogue. the Jewish population left Kfar Bar'am, which became a mainly Christian village called Kafr Bir'im on the Lebanese border, which was  bulldozed by Israel in 1949. The Christian Arab inhabitants of the town were evicted from their homes due to the Israel Defense Forces insistence that the border area with Lebanon be empty of Palestinians.

Kibbutz Bar'am
Modern Bar'am is a secular kibbutz established by members of the socialist Hashomer Hatzair movement on 14 June 1949 to guard and hold the border with Lebanon by demobilized Palmach soldiers. Baram was the last kibbutz to dispense with the communal child rearing system that was once typical of kibbutzes in 1997, is looked upon by many as a sort of "nature reserve." A few kibbutzim have remained faithful to the original utopian ideology of everybody on the kibbutz being equal regardless of how long their tenure, and still provide three square meals a day in a communal dining room and hold general meetings to discuss and vote on important issues relating to Baram. Life in Bar'am centers around agriculture as well as tourism related to the nearby ancient synagogues and ruins, and the kibbutz has one of the largest volunteer programs. 

Bar'am is one of the most popular kibbutzes for volunteers. Every Tuesday and Friday the kibbutzniks and volunteers can party at the local town pub. Volunteers hail from South Africa, Denmark, Sweden, the US, Japan, South Korea, Canada, Britain, Brazil, Columbia, Ecuador, Mexico and Burma.
  
In 2006, during the Second Lebanon War, the kibbutz came under attack from Hezbollah forces and suffered heavy shelling and missile fire which damaged the agricultural fields. The kibbutz is located mere metres away from the Lebanese border, and the Hezbollah flag flying in front of homes across the border is a common sight. 

In July 2006, several Katyusha missiles exploded in nearby fields.

Economy
The economy of Kibbutz Bar'am is centered around agriculture, as Bar'am is home to numerous orchards where a variety of fruits including apples, pears, nectarines, plums, kiwi, and Chinese gooseberries are grown and harvested. The fields are tended by Jewish volunteers who live on the kibbutz. Some of the volunteers are from Israel, while most of the are Jews from abroad from countries such as Mexico, Canada, Australia, Columbia, the USA, and more. The kibbutz is also home to a packing plant, where the fruit is sorted, packed and kept in cold storage until it is delivered to markets throughout Israel. Other crops include corn, peanuts and sunflower seeds. In addition, the kibbutz has ponds for fish farming. The kibbutz also has land holdings cultivated with cotton in the Hula Valley, near Ne'ot Mordehai.
 
The kibbutz also has a factory that manufactures plastics for medical purposes.

Culture
The culture of Bar'am centers around kibbutz life and is a blend of local Israeli culture and various foreign cultures brought by the kibbutz volunteers who hail from all over the world. operates the Bar David Museum, which houses bi-annual exhibitions from the large permanent collection of paintings and Jewish ritual objects, plus temporary exhibitions of fine art, sculpture and photography, and a small Archeology Room that exhibits objects from the region, such as ceramic and glass artefacts and jewellery and statuettes.

See also
Oldest synagogues in the world

References

Bibliography

External links
Official website 
Kibbutzniks trade in socialism for stocks Atlanta Jewish Times, 4 November 2005
Rockets fell on the new Tuscany The Economist, 17 August 2006
the Fourth Annual Inuit-Israeli Tour Canada Awakening
Photos of Baram at the Manar al-Athar photo archive

Kibbutzim
Kibbutz Movement
Populated places established in 1949
1949 establishments in Israel
Populated places in Northern District (Israel)
Romanian-Jewish culture in Israel